Freemake is a software brand by Ellora Assets Corporation. It can refer to:
 Freemake Audio Converter
 Freemake Music Box
 Freemake Video Converter
 Freemake Video Downloader